James Du Pré (1778–1870), of Wilton Park, Beaconsfield, Buckinghamshire, was an English politician.

He was the son of Josias Du Pre (1721-1780), former Governor of Madras and educated at Eton College (1791) and Christ Church, Oxford (1796-1800). He succeeded his father to Wilton Park in 1780.

Du Pré was a Member (MP) of the Parliament of Great Britain (and then the Parliament of the United Kingdom) for Gatton 29 Apr. 1800–1802, for Aylesbury 1802–1804 and for Chichester 1807–1812.

He was selected High Sheriff of Buckinghamshire for 1825–26.

He married in 1801 Madelina, the daughter of Sir William Maxwell, 4th Bt., of Monreith, Wigtown. They had 3 sons and 8 daughters.

References

1778 births
1870 deaths
19th-century English people
People from Buckinghamshire
People educated at Eton College
Alumni of Christ Church, Oxford
Members of the Parliament of Great Britain for English constituencies
British MPs 1796–1800
Members of the Parliament of the United Kingdom for English constituencies
UK MPs 1801–1802
UK MPs 1802–1806
UK MPs 1807–1812
High Sheriffs of Buckinghamshire